The Liberal Democratic Congress ( (KLD)) was a conservative-liberal political party in Poland.

The party, led by Donald Tusk, had roots in the Solidarity movement.  It advocated free market economy and individual liberty (however in Catholic understanding), rejected extremism and fanaticism and favoured European integration (in the form of European Union membership), rapid privatisation of the enterprises still owned by the Polish state and decentralisation of the government.

Until 1991 was a part of the Centre Agreement led by the Kaczynski brothers. In the 1991 general elections KLD got 7.5% of the votes and 37 seats in the Sejm (total 460 seats). In 1993 KLD got 4.0% of the votes and was left without seats.

It merged on March 20, 1994 with the Democratic Union (Unia Demokratyczna) into the Freedom Union (Unia Wolności, UW). Some of the former KLD members decided in January 2001 to move to join the new Civic Platform. The KLD group within Civic Platform is now seen as moderate conservative. The liberal faction within Civic Platform is small and insignificant, represented by such politicians as Bartłomiej Sienkiewicz and Adam Szejnfeld.

Election results

Sejm

Senate

References

See also
List of Liberal Democratic Congress politicians
Contributions to liberal theory
List of liberal parties
Liberal democracy

1990 establishments in Poland
1994 disestablishments in Poland
Catholic political parties
Centrist parties in Poland
Conservative liberal parties
Conservative parties in Poland
Defunct liberal political parties
Defunct political parties in Poland
Liberal parties in Poland
Political parties disestablished in 1994
Political parties established in 1990
Pro-European political parties in Poland